Asian Music may refer to:

Music of Asia
Asian Music (journal), an academic journal
Asian Music (record label), a Nepalese music company